Severe Tropical Cyclone Fran was the third tropical cyclone within four weeks to impact Vanuatu in 1992. Fran formed on March 4 and then gradually intensified. Winds reached gale-force on March 5, and hurricane-force a few days later. Cyclone Fran reached the powerful Category 5 equivalent on the Saffir–Simpson Hurricane Scale near Vanuatu. The storm weakened somewhat due to land interaction, but briefly re-intensified after moving away from land. Fran gradually weakened over the next several days over less favorable conditions. Meanwhile, the storm passed north of New Caledonia. Eventually, as a Category 2 system on the Australian scale, Fran made landfall on Queensland during March 16. Severe Tropical Cyclone Fran turned towards the southeast and eventually headed back out to sea. The system dissipated the next day. On Efate, over 130 houses lost roofs. Along Queensland, two rivers sustained major flooding, but no deaths were attributed to this cyclone. Total damage from the system was AU$8–10 million (1992 AUD). Moderate damage was also reported in Fiji. In New Caledonia, the storm brought flooding and landslides.

Meteorological history

During March 4, as Severe Tropical Cyclone Esau was passing over New Caledonia, an area of convergence was approaching the French island of Wallis. As the system moved south-westwards towards Wallis, a circulation developed within this area of convergence and the Fiji Meteorological Service started to monitor it as a shallow tropical depression. Over the next day, the system slowly developed and organised further as it was steered south-southwestwards, in between the islands of Wallis and Futuna by a strong mid-level ridge of high pressure. At 18:00 UTC on March 5, the FMS named it Fran, after it had developed gale-force winds and become a Category 1 tropical cyclone on the Australian tropical cyclone intensity scale. During the next day, the Naval Pacific Meteorology and Oceanography Center initiated advisories on the system and designated it as Tropical Cyclone 25P. However, during March 7, the United States Joint Typhoon Warning Center (JTWC) took over the issuance of advisories on Fran from the NPMOC, as it had crossed the 180th meridian into its area of responsibility.

As the system continued to intensify and move south-southwestwards, it posed a serious threat to the central islands of Vanuatu, including Efate, Tanna, Aneityum, Futuna and Erromango. During March 8, the FMS reported that the system had peaked with 10-minute sustained windspeeds of winds of 205 km/h (125 mph), which made it a Category 5 Severe Tropical Cyclone on the Australian Scale. During that day, the JTWC reported that the system had peaked with 1-minute sustained windspeeds of 260 km/h (160 mph), which made it equivalent to a Category 5 hurricane on the Saffir–Simpson hurricane wind scale. After peaking in intensity, Fran continued to move south-southwestwards and passed in between the islands of Efate and Erromango during March 9. The system emerged into the Coral Sea later that day and threatened New Caledonia, as it started to gradually weaken as a result of an increase in vertical windshear. The system passed to the north of New Caledonia as a Category 4 severe tropical cyclone at around 0000 UTC on March 10, before it passed in between the Loyalty Islands of Belep and Surprise. Fran also moved across 160°E and into the Australian region as a Category 3 severe tropical cyclone during March 11, where the Australian Bureau of Meteorology (BoM) started to issue warnings on the system.

Over the next few days, Fran maintained its intensity as a Category 3 severe tropical cyclone, as it slowed down and moved erratically towards Australia's Queensland Coast. By this time the system had started to move southwards and encounter vertical wind shear, from a mid-level ridge of high pressure to the southwest. During the following day, Fran made landfall at around 17:00 UTC (04:00 AEST) on the Queensland coast, near the town of 1770 as a Category 2 tropical cyclone. After moving over land, Fran degenerated into a tropical depression before it recurved south-eastwards and moved back over the Coral Sea during March 16. The system subsequently interacted with a mid-level trough of low pressure, which caused it to become an extratropical cyclone. Fran's extratropical remnants moved back into the South Pacific basin later that day, where they were monitored by New Zealand's MetService. Fran's remnants passed over Norfolk Island during March 17, before they were last noted during March 21, as they merged with a trough of low pressure to the north of New Zealand.

Effects
The effects of Severe Tropical Cyclone Fran were felt over a large area of the Southern Pacific, as it impacted the island nations of Wallis and Futuna, Fiji, Vanuatu, New Caledonia and Queensland. Overall it was responsible for five deaths and the name Fran was later retired from the South Pacific lists of tropical cyclone names.

Tropical Cyclone Fran impacted the islands of Wallis and Futuna between March 5 – 8, where damage to roofs, trees, telephones and power lines was reported. The system subsequently went on to pass to the north of Fiji during March 7, where no formal assessments of the damage took place. However, it was estimated by the Fiji National Disaster Management Office, that Fran had caused a minor-moderate amount of damage.

Vanuatu
After affecting both Fiji and Wallis and Futuna, Fran became the fourth of five tropical cyclones to impact Vanuatu during the 1991–92 season. Ahead of the system impacting the island nation between March 8–10, various warnings were issued by the Vanuatu National Disaster Management Office, while people were urged to stay at home, schools were closed, flights cancelled and evacuation centres were opened. Damage was widespread but variable on Efate, with places that were exposed to the south and west of Fran worst hit, including the village of Pango located just outside Port Vila. The roofs of 130 homes were destroyed and as a result suffered water damage, including on the Parliamentary complex of buildings. Port Vila was without electricity and fresh water supply for several days, while there was major damage reported to several buildings. Roads were blocked and On Erromango considerable damage to crops was reported while several homes were damaged.

New Caledonia
As Fran impacted Vanuatu, the whole of New Caledonia was placed under a pre-alert, before cyclone warning number 1 was issued for the French territory during March 9. This warning required schools to close and advised people to take shelter indoors.

In New Caledonia, flooding and mudslides occurred. A total of 150 boxes were damaged or destroyed.

Queensland
During March 12, a tropical cyclone watch was issued by the BoM, for the Queensland coast between Bowen and Bundaberg, before it was upgraded to a tropical cyclone warning during the following day.

Floods affected Southern Queensland and some 17 houses were unroofed near Bundaberg.

Considerable damage to the trees were reported and many birds were killed, but no damage from buildings were reported. One Casuarina was lost during the cyclone. Significant erosion and loss of materials were reported. The cyclone continued the process of removing fine material from the top of the island. Despite significant beach erosion, there were no significant accumulation of fines on the reef and thus there were no harmful impacts to the flora and fauna on the coral reef.

In Australia, officials closed beaches along the Sunshine and Gold Coasts. In addition, train services from Brisbane were cancelled.

In preparation of the storm, officials closed beaches along the Sunshine and Gold Coasts. In addition, train services from Brisbane were cancelled. Across Queensland, coastal towns were flooded, uprooting trees and knocking out power. Several roofs were torn off of homes and some flooding was reported. Winds and flooding caused minor property damage, but considerable crop losses along were reported the coast, with the worst effects in Bundaberg. A total of 40 houses were uproofed throughout Bundaberg. In Burnett Heads, 3 yachts were damaged. Heavy swells caused damage on Heron Island and severe erosion on the Gold and Sunshine Coasts. Overall, 2,624 insurance claims were made because of property damage. Total damage from the system was 8–10 million (1992 AUD), while insurance losses were estimated at $2.5 million (1992 AUD).

References

External links

Tropical cyclones in Queensland
Tropical cyclones in Vanuatu
Category 5 South Pacific cyclones
Category 3 Australian region cyclones
1992 in Australia
Tropical cyclones in Wallis and Futuna
Tropical cyclones in Fiji
1991–92 South Pacific cyclone season
Retired South Pacific cyclones
1992 in Wallis and Futuna
Tropical cyclones in New Caledonia